The 1927–28 Seconda Divisione was the second edition of a sub-national third level tournament within the Italian football championship.

It was divided into two fully independent championships, the Northern one which was the main League and the Southern one which was till amatorial. However, another reform occurred at the end of this season.

Regulations
The ”Northern Lower Divisions Directory”, which had its headquarters in Genoa, doubled its championship, after protests from many clubs put in the regional amatorial tournaments by the 1926 reform. It was now composed of six groups of ten clubs, a total of 60 teams. The winners of any group should be promoted, while the last two teams should be relegated. A final for the title was planned.

The ”Southern Lower Divisions Directory”, which had its headquarters in Rome, organized its 28 teams into four groups. The winners of any group of Southern Authority qualified to the final group. The winner of the final group should be promoted.

However, in 1928 the fascists decided to complete the championship reform they partially stopped in 1926. As originally planned, the Higher National Authority would finally organize three championships, while the Northern Lower Authority would lose its hybrid nature to be reduced to a local fourth-tier tournament.

Teams 
22 clubs confirmed their spots from the previous year. 38 teams were promoted or invited from the 7 regions of the Third Division.

In Southern Italy 20 clubs confirmed their place while 8 teams were allowed to enter from the 6 regional championships.

Northern Authority

Group A

Rivarolese qualified to the finals.
Rivarolese, Corniglianese, Acqui, Ventimigliese admitted to Higher Directory for championship reform.
The remaining clubs remained in the league turned into a local championship.
Officine Genoa merged with Rivarolese.

Group B

Saronno qualified to the finals.
Saronno, Seregno, Gallaratese, Varese admitted to Higher Directory for championship reform.
The remaining clubs remained in the league turned into a local championship.
Valle Cervo, Juve Domo disbanded.

Group C

Viareggio qualified to the finals.
Viareggio, Sestri Levante, Rapallo Ruentes admitted to Higher Directory for championship reform.
The remaining clubs remained in the league turned into a local championship.
Fiorenza merged into Fiorentina.

Group D
 

Piacenza qualified to the finals.
Piacenza, Fanfulla, Codogno, Crema admitted to Higher Directory for championship reform.
The remaining clubs remained in the league turned into a local championship.

Group E
  

Forlì qualified to the finals.
Forlì, Faenza, Thiene, Trento admitted to Higher Directory for championship reform.
The remaining clubs remained in the league turned into a local championship.
Bentegodi Verona merged into Hellas.

Group F
  

Edera Trieste qualified to the finals.
Edera Trieste, Pro Gorizia, Fiume, Grion Pola admitted to Higher Directory for championship reform.
The remaining clubs remained in the league turned into a local championship.
Petrarca merged into Padova and Montebellunese disbanded.

Southern Authority

Group A

Verdetti
Rosetana qualified to the finals.
Perugia, Tiferno disqualified and relegated.

Group B

Verdetti
Goliarda qualified to the finals. 
Romano merged with Virtus Goliarda and US Romana disbanded.

Group C

Verdetti
Salernitana qualified to the finals.
Scafatese and Torre Maggiore disqualified and relegated.

Group D

Verdetti
Messinese qualified to the finals.
Umberto I disbanded.

Southern Finals

Goliarda Roma Southern Championship winner.
The FIGC did not considered Southern Italy ready for a full championship reform, so all clubs were put into a special one-year Southern Championship, postponing any decision to 1929.

Championship Cup 
The group winners of Northern Italy played for the national title, because they were considered evidently stronger than the Southern clubs by the FIGC. However, Rivarolese and Saronno retired from this cup.

Edera Champions of Second Division 1928. However, as a former football club of the disbanded Italian Republican Party (Edera=ivy, the PRI symbol), it was disliked by the fascists so it was merged with another club from Trieste, Ponziana, to form new ASPE.

Notes

Luigi Saverio Bertazzoni, Annuario Italiano del Giuoco del Calcio (it.)

1927-1928
3